Royal Garrison Church may refer to:

Royal Garrison Church, 'home' church for the Anglican military personnel serving at Aldershot in Hampshire in the UK
Domus Dei, an almshouse and hospice at Portsmouth in Hampshire, UK, also known as the Royal Garrison Church